Hello Walls is the fifth album by country music singer Faron Young.

Track listing

References

1961 albums
Faron Young albums
albums produced by Ken Nelson (United States record producer)
Capitol Records albums